Ephippion guttifer, commonly known as the prickly puffer, is a species of pufferfish native to the coasts of the eastern Atlantic Ocean from Gibraltar to Angola.  This species grows to a length of  TL.  It is of importance to commercial fisheries and is popular as a gamefish.  This species has the ability to get prickly when it puffs up. It is the only known member of the monotypic genus Ephippion.

References
 

Tetraodontidae
Taxa named by Gabriel Bibron
Monotypic fish genera